WNHU (88.7 FM) is a radio station  broadcasting a variety format. Licensed to West Haven, Connecticut, United States, the station serves the New Haven area. The station is owned by the University of New Haven.  The WNHU studios moved to its current home on Ruden Street into the Lois Evalyn Bergami Broadcast Media Center in the year 2015. Its location on Ruden Street includes a production space for live and recorded programming, a server room, staff offices and a student lounge. WNHU is managed by a 10-person student leadership team. Positions include Station Manager, Promotions Director, Aircheck Director, WNHU Program Director, Director of Fundraising, Program/Music Director and Productions Director.

The University of New Haven's Communications department started to work with the radio station for students to have access to the station. The Station operates as a lab for student learning, and as a source of culturally diverse programming for the communities we serve. In January 2016, Bruce Barber was hired as General Manager of the station.

WNHU is broadcast on 88.7 FM. WNHU is considered the best college radio station in the state of Connecticut according to the New Haven Advocate, which has awarded the station "Best College Radio Station" for over 6 consecutive years.
WNHU is known for eclectic programming with shows ranging from new music, rock, gospel, funk, and talk shows to specialty formats such as polka and Irish music. The station was founded as a student club in 1970, and features an eclectic mix of music and conversation from over 100 volunteer student and community deejays. Unlike many college or community radio stations where DJs change frequently, some WNHU personalities have hosted shows for years, most of whom are UNH students and alumni.

On June 4, 2013, WNHU broadcast an 11-hour live set featuring DJs of the founding decade of the station. This day-long event, which was held from 10:00 a.m. to 9:00 p.m. EST was in celebration of the station's 40th anniversary. WNHU first broadcast live on the air on June 4, 1973.

WNHU-2 
Students usually start their time on the station with WNHU-2, the online stream from the University of New Haven. Training for students to start their own show is taught by the WNHU2 Director, currently Leah Walker. As stated on wnhu.org, "An unfiltered sense of creative freedom is what WNHU-2 is all about, so you may encounter explicit language, lyrics, and stories. The views expressed on WNHU-2 are those of our students and our students alone."[4]

Current Student Employees 
2019-2020
 Station Manager: Rebecca Satzberg
 Promotions/Social Media Director: Lynnsey Spader
 Assistant Promotions Directors: Amy Suraci and Ricky Hauser
 Production Director: Kayla Mutchler
 Program/Music Director: PJ Tucker
 WNHU2 Program Director: Leah Walker
 Director of Fundraising: Jake Paul 
 Aircheck Director: Hunter Cary

References

External links 
 WNHU website
 

Radio stations established in 1973
University of New Haven
West Haven, Connecticut
Mass media in New Haven County, Connecticut
NHU
NHU
1973 establishments in Connecticut